Ruben Reuter (born 28 June 2000) is an English actor, best known for his role as Finn McLaine in The Dumping Ground.

Early and personal life
Reuter was born in Huddersfield to parents Kim Reuter and Russ Elias. Reuter has Down Syndrome and attended Royds Hall School. He is trained by his parents’ theatre group, Shabang!.

Career
Reuter appeared in an episode of My Life in 2013. Reuter joined The Dumping Ground in series 3 as Finn McLaine. Reuter reprised the role of Finn McLaine in a The Dumping Ground spin-off, The Dumping Ground: I'm..., a webisode series.

He also works as a reporter and disability correspondent for Channel 4 News.

Reuter and actress Ruth Madeley, who has spina bifida, appeared in a documentary from Channel 4 on disability and abortion titled Disability and Abortion: The Hardest Choice. The documentary aired in August 2022.

Filmography

References

External links

2000 births
Living people
English male television actors
English male child actors
21st-century English male actors
Male actors from Huddersfield
Actors with Down syndrome
People from Slaithwaite
Television presenters with disabilities